John Shapland (March 4, 1832 – February 5, 1923) was an English soldier who fought for the Union Army of the United States during the American Civil War. He received the Medal of Honor for valor.

Biography
Shapland served in the 104th Illinois Infantry Regiment. He received the Medal of Honor on October 30, 1897 for his actions at Elk River, Tennessee on July 2, 1863.

Medal of Honor citation

Citation:

Voluntarily joined a small party that, under a heavy fire, captured a stockade and saved the bridge."

See also

 List of American Civil War Medal of Honor recipients: Q-S

References

External links
 
 Military Times

1832 births
1923 deaths
Union Army soldiers
United States Army Medal of Honor recipients
American Civil War recipients of the Medal of Honor